Lantoniaina Rabenatoandro (born June 15, 1960 in Antananarivo) is a Malagasy politician. He is a member of the Senate of Madagascar for Vakinankaratra, and is a member of the Tiako I Madagasikara party.

References
Official page on the Senate website 

1960 births
Living people
Members of the Senate (Madagascar)
Tiako I Madagasikara politicians
People from Antananarivo